Aseroe is a small genus of basidiomycete fungi of the family Phallaceae, though sometimes placed in the separate family Clathraceae. The genus name is derived from the Ancient Greek words Asē/αση 'disgust' and roē/ροη 'juice'. The genus was described with the collection and description of the type species Aseroe rubra in 1800 by French botanist Jacques Labillardière. As with other stinkhorn-like fungi, mature fruiting bodies are covered with olive-brown slime, containing spores, which attracts flies. These fungi are common in mulch and are saprobic.

Species 
, Species Fungorum accepted 3 species of Aseroe. 
 Aseroe coccinea
 Aseroe genovefae
 Aseroe rubra

References

External links

Phallales
Agaricomycetes genera
Taxa named by Jacques Labillardière